Stephen Robbins  (born 1953) is a British Church of England priest and former British Army officer. He is bishop's chaplain to Nick Holtam, Bishop of Salisbury. He was previously the most senior military chaplain in the British Army, serving as Chaplain-General from 2008 to 2011.

Honours and decorations
Robbins was awarded the Queen's Commendation for Valuable Service 'in recognition of gallant and distinguished services in Northern Ireland during the period 1 October 1998 to 31 March 1999'. In the 2011 New Years Honours, Robbins was appointed Companion of the Order of the Bath (CB), military division.

References

 

 
 
 

Living people
20th-century English Anglican priests
21st-century English Anglican priests
Chaplains General to the Forces
Companions of the Order of the Bath
Recipients of the Commendation for Valuable Service
Church of England archdeacons (military)
1953 births